Szép, Szep may refer to:

In people:
  (1884 – 1953), Jewish Hungarian poet, writer, journalist
 Jason Szep (b. 1969), U.S. journalist 
 Jenő Szép (1920 – 2004), Hungarian mathematician and professor
 Paul Szep (b. 1941), Canadian political cartoonist
  (b. 1972), Hungarian handball player
 Tamás Szép (b. 1973), Hungarian football player

In other uses:
 Zappa–Szép product, mathematics
 Szép sniper rifle of Hungary

Hungarian words and phrases
Hungarian-language surnames